Lexias canescens, the yellow archduke, is a species of butterfly belonging to the family Nymphalidae. It was first described by Arthur Gardiner Butler in 1869.

Subspecies
Subspecies include:
Lexias c. leopardina (Fruhstorfer, 1913)
Lexias c. ornatus Tsukada, 1991
Lexias c. pardalina (Staudinger, 1886)
Lexias c. tigrina (Fruhstorfer, 1913)
Lexias c. civetta (Fruhstorfer, 1913)

Distribution and habitat
This species is present in Southeast Asia (Borneo, Peninsular Malaya, Singapore, Sumatra, Bangka Island, Sulu Islands, Belitung). These butterflies inhabit tropical forests among undergrowth and on shaded trails.

Description
These butterflies have dark brown and whitish or yellow-spotted upper surface of the wings, which is an efficient camouflage against predators. Caterpillars are pale green with long spinous bristles.

The male of Lexias canescens pardalina is rather similar to a small female of Lexias pardalis but the underside of its hindwings shows a yellow-washed color.

Biology
Adults can be found year-round, with a peak from June to September. They mainly feed on organic matter and rotting fruit.

Bibliography
Khew Sin Khoon. A Field Guide to the Butterflies of Singapore.
Beccaloni, G.W., Scoble, M.J., Robinson, G.S. & Pitkin, B. (Editors). (2003) The Global Lepidoptera Names Index (LepIndex).
Yokochi, T. 1995: Two new subspecies of Lexias canescens Butler from Indonesia (Lepidoptera: Nymphalidae). Futao 19: 8–9.
Casteleyn, 2004, Butterflies of the World: Nymphalidae VIII, Lexias
Yutaka Inayoshi - Butterflies in Indo-China

References

External links
 "Lexias canescens pardalina Yellow Archduke".  Butterfly Circle
 Thai Butterflies
 Flickr

canescens
Articles containing video clips